Baker Street is a compilation album released in 1998 by Gerry Rafferty. It features 16 of his best hits from 1978 to 1982.

Track listing
"Baker Street" – 6:11
"Right Down the Line" – 4:30
"City to City" – 5:05
"Waiting for the Day" – 5:47
"Get It Right Next Time" – 4:44
"Take the Money and Run" – 5:53
"Days Gone Down (Still Got The Light In Your Eyes)" – 6:32
"Why Won't You Talk to Me" – 4:02
"The Royal Mile" – 3:50
"Wastin' Away" – 3:31
"Bring it All Home" – 4:43
"Don't Close the Door" – 3:48
"Sleepwalking" – 3:53
"A Change of Heart" – 4:10
"On the Way" – 4:22
"Night Owl" – 6:10

Certifications

References

1998 compilation albums
Gerry Rafferty albums